San Ignacio Municipality may refer to:
 San Ignacio Municipality, Santa Cruz, Bolivia
 San Ignacio Municipality, Beni, Bolivia
 San Ignacio, Chalatenango, El Salvador
 San Ignacio, Francisco Morazán, Honduras
 San Ignacio Cerro Gordo, Jalisco, Mexico
 San Ignacio Municipality, Sinaloa, Mexico

Municipality name disambiguation pages